Never Give In is a 2013 album by Will Hoge.

Never Give In may also refer to:

Albums
Never Give In!, a 2014 album by Razors in the Night
Never Give In, a Bad Brains tribute album featuring Will Haven and Moby
 Never Give In, a 1987  album by Pato Banton

Songs
 "Never Give In", a song by Biohazard from the album Reborn in Defiance
 "Never Give In", a song by Black Veil Brides from the album We Stitch These Wounds
 "Never Give In", a 1982 song by Dogsflesh
 "Never Give In", a song by Oi Polloi from the album Fight Back!
 "Never Give In", a song by The Streets from the album Everything Is Borrowed
 "Never Give In", a song by Attacco Decente from the album Crystal Night
 "Never Give In", a 2014 song by Mackintosh Braun
 "Never Give In", a song by Skinlab from the album ReVoltingRoom
 "Never Give In", a song by Luna Mortis from the album The Absence
 "Never Give In", a song by Ensign from the album Cast the First Stone
 "Never Give In", a song by Hermes House Band from the album Get Ready to Party
 "Never Give In", a 1980 song by Jay Delmore

TV Shows
 "Never Give In" (a.k.a. Sir Alex Ferguson: Never Give In) was a 2021 Television show on Amazon Prime about the life of football manager, Alex Ferguson .